Torre Waters is a 69-storey skyscraper in Avenida Balboa, Panama City. Reaching a height of 232 metres, it is the 12th tallest building in the country.

Materials 
 Glass
 Steel
 Concrete

See also 
Bicsa Financial Center
Arts Tower (Panama City)
List of tallest buildings in Panama City

References 

Residential skyscrapers in Panama City

Residential buildings completed in 2011